Susan Gray (born ) is a British former civil servant who served as Second Permanent Secretary in the Cabinet Office from May 2021 to March 2023, where she reported to the Chancellor of the Duchy of Lancaster. Her report into the Partygate scandal criticised the government led by Boris Johnson and contributed to his downfall as Prime Minister. 

She resigned from the Civil Service in March 2023 in preparation for her plans to take up a job as Chief of Staff to the Leader of the Opposition, Keir Starmer. Her appointment has not yet been finalised as it is subject to scrutiny by the Advisory Committee on Business Appointments (Acoba). Resigning or retiring Civil Servants of her senior level, must wait at least 3 months before accepting outside employment.

Early life and background 
Born in north London, Gray is the daughter of Irish immigrants who moved to Tottenham in the early 1950s; her father was a furniture salesman and her mother a barmaid. She studied at a state-funded Roman Catholic school. Following her father's sudden death in 1975, Gray abandoned her plan of going to university and joined the Civil Service straight from school. 

Gray took a career break in the 1980s, a step described by journalist Sam McBride as "strikingly unorthodox", when she ran the Cove Bar, a pub in Newry, a border town in Northern Ireland, during The Troubles, with her husband Bill Conlon, a country music singer from Portaferry, County Down.  Peter Caldwell, a former special adviser to several ministers, said it had been speculated Gray was a spy at this time, though Gray denied it. According to the Belfast Telegraph, her car was stopped one night by IRA paramilitaries who wanted to take it, only for her to be allowed to pass after a voice said "That's Sue Gray from The Cove, let her go on". 

The family returned to London in 1987. Gray has family connections to Northern Ireland and is reported to have a fondness for the region, which she visits with her husband. She has two sons, including Liam Conlon, who is the chair of the Labour Party Irish Society.

Career

Cabinet Office

She joined the Cabinet Office in the late 1990s, after previous postings to health, transport, and work and pensions. She eventually served in the Cabinet Office as the director, and then from 2012 director-general, of the propriety and ethics team and head of the Private Offices Group, directly under the Cabinet Secretary. In her role overseeing ministerial offices and ethics in government, and so taking on sensitive matters and 'crises' arising around how government is run, Gray was described as "the woman who runs the country".

In 2011, Gray advised Michael Gove that conducting government business via private e-mail accounts would make it exempt from transparency laws, which was found incorrect in 2012 by the Information Commissioner. In 2012 alone, as part of her miscellaneous duties, she ran the "Plebgate" inquiry inside the Cabinet Office, the 2010+ reform of non-departmental public bodies, and the investigation into allegations against Damian Green MP relating to his use of computers intended for work purposes; Green was subsequently fired from his Cabinet position.

In January 2018, the Northern Ireland Executive announced that Gray would transfer to the Northern Ireland Civil Service as Permanent Secretary of the Department of Finance in the Northern Ireland Executive from May 2018. In April 2018, it was announced that Gray would be replaced at the Cabinet Office by Helen MacNamara. In 2020, Gray sought but failed to be appointed as the head of the Northern Ireland Civil Service, and in a subsequent interview with the BBC said: "I suspect people may have thought that I perhaps was too much of a challenger, or a disrupter. I am both…" In May 2021, Gray returned to Whitehall to become the Second Permanent Secretary in the Cabinet Office, reporting to the Chancellor of the Duchy of Lancaster, to be in charge of policy on the Union and the constitution. As such, she reported initially to Michael Gove, who was replaced in September 2021 by Steve Barclay.

Following press reports about gatherings and parties on government premises during restrictions related to the COVID-19 pandemic in December 2021 – a controversy which became widely known as "Partygate" – the Cabinet Secretary Simon Case initiated and led an investigation into the allegations. A few days later he recused himself after it became known that an event had been held in his own office, and subsequently Gray took over the investigation. Whether Prime Minister Boris Johnson knew about and participated in gatherings at Downing Street is part of the investigation. Gray's initial findings were published on 31 January 2022. In the report, Gray condemned "a serious failure" in the standards of leadership, and also stated that a string of gatherings were "difficult to justify" while millions were unable to meet their friends and relatives. Publication of the full report was postponed pending the completion of an investigation by the Metropolitan Police.  The police reported in May 2022 that their inquiries had resulted in 126 fixed penalty notices being issued.<ref>[https://www.bbc.co.uk/news/uk-61539326 Christy Cooney, Justin Parkinson, "Deadline approaches for officials set to be named by Sue Gray", BBC News, 22 May 2022]. Retrieved 22 May 2022</ref>  Gray's final report was delivered to Johnson on 25 May 2022 and it was published later that morning. Friends of Gray have reportedly said that she was "bruised" by the investigation.

 Resignation 
In March 2023, it was reported that Sir Keir Starmer, leader of the Labour Party and the Leader of the Opposition, was considering appointing Gray as his chief of staff. Gray resigned from her post as Cabinet Office Second Permanent Secretary and left the Civil Service. She has reportedly accepted an offer to work for Starmer as his chief of staff, though it is unknown when she will take up this position. Her appointment is subject to the approval of the Advisory Committee on Business Appointments and ultimately the prime minister Rishi Sunak, who may decide to block the appointment. If approved, this will be Gray's first party political role. 
Following her resignation and her prospective employment within the Labour Party, some Conservative MPs criticised Gray, MP Alex Stafford, told the BBC that Gray’s appointment “undermines the work that she’s done and undermines the civil service.” Nadine Dorries questioned her ability to act impartially in her role as author of the Partygate report. By contrast former minister Francis Maude stated had not the "slightest reason to question either her integrity or her political impartiality" and Bob Kerslake, former head of the civil service stated he could not see a problem with the appointment given "the role is as much an organising one as a political one" and also noted that Jonathan Powell and Ed Llewellyn, Tony Blair's and David Cameron's Chiefs of Staff respectively, were both previously employed in the civil service.

 Reputation 

Gray has been portrayed as relatively unknown but once highly influential, and has been described as "an enigma". In 2015, a profile by Chris Cook, then policy editor for the BBC's Newsnight, claimed that she was "notorious… for her determination not to leave a document trail", had advised special advisers how to destroy emails through "double-deletion" and made at least six interventions "to tell departments to fight disclosures under the Freedom of Information Act". She was described by former prime minister Gordon Brown, in his memoir, as someone who could be counted on for "wise advice when – as all too regularly happened – mini-crises and crises befell". Rajeev Syal in The Guardian described her as "an uncompromising operator". Political journalist Andrew Gimson wrote: "All power to the Civil Service is her modus operandi. She owes her allegiance to the permanent government and the deep state." Former cabinet minister Oliver Letwin wrote of her: "Unless she agrees, things just don’t happen. Cabinet reshuffles, departmental reorganizations, the whole lot – it's all down to Sue Gray". 

References

External links

 Sue Gray – Edition of Profile'' on BBC Radio 4
   Findings of Second Permanent Secretary’s Investigation into Alleged Gatherings on Government Premises during Covid Restrictions, 25 May 2022

1950s births
Living people
Year of birth uncertain
British civil servants
English people of Irish descent
Civil servants in the Cabinet Office
British publicans
Civil servants from London
British Permanent Secretaries